Shaji Choudhary (born 7 July 1972) is an Indian actor who played supporting roles in movies and TV serials. Born in Dodwari, Rajasthan, Shaji is known for his roles in Main Hoon Na, Jodhaa Akbar as Adham Khan, Shaurya Aur Suhani, PK as Tapasvi Maharaja's bodyguard, and Mirzapur as Maqbool Khan.

Early life and family background 
Shaji was born in the village Dodwari in Tonk, Rajasthan, to farmer parents. His father's name is Roopnarayan Choudhary and his mother's name is Rampyari Choudhary. When Shaji was 12 years old, he moved to Jaipur with his elder brother. Shaji had completed schooling from St. Soldiers and completed his college education from Rajasthan University, Shaji has four brothers and a sister. Shaji married his wife Subdhara Choudhary at the age of ten, with whom he has two children. His daughter's name is Vaishali Choudhary and his son's name is Manas Choudhary.

Career 
Shaji first moved to Mumbai on 13 March 2004, where he started his acting career with an appearance in the second season of the TV serial Shaktimaan on DD1 as the villain Kilvish (The role of Kilvish was portrayed by Surendra Pal in Season One). Shaji made his first Bollywood appearance in the movie Main Hoon Na (2004). In 2008, Shaji got to work alongside Hrithik Roshan and Aishwarya Rai Bachchan when the director Ashutosh Gowariker signed him to play the character of Akbar's general Adham Khan in the historical drama film Jodhaa Akbar (2008). Later, Shaji featured as Aghor in Shaurya Aur Suhani (2009), a romantic soap opera in which he essayed a minor role. In 2014, Shaji played Tapasvi Maharaj's bodyguard in the movie PK(2014). Shaji was cast as Maqbool Khan in Mirzapur (TV series) as Kaleen Bhaiya's (Pankaj Tripathi) trusted henchman.

Filmography

Awards 
Best supporting actor National featured Films JNFF 2018 (Jharkhand National Film Festival).

References 

Living people
1972 births
Indian male television actors
Indian male film actors
21st-century Indian male actors